Surround is a video game programmed  by Alan Miller and published by Atari, Inc. for the Atari Video Computer System (later known as the Atari 2600). It was one of the nine Atari VCS launch titles released in September 1977. Surround is an unofficial port of the arcade video game Blockade, released the previous year by Gremlin Industries. It is the first home console version of the game that became widely known across many platforms as Snake. Atari licensed it to Sears which released it under the name Chase.

Gameplay 

Like its predecessor Blockade, the object of Surround is to maneuver a square across the screen, leaving a trail behind. A player wins by forcing the other player to crash into one of the trails. Twelve game variations include options allow for speed-up, diagonal movement, wrap-around, and "erase" (the choice to not draw at a given moment). In addition, the sprites can be set to operate at a slower speed, or progressively speed up through five speeds.

Two additional variations provide a non-game mode called "Video Graffiti" in which players use the joysticks to draw pictures on the screen.

Reception 
The cartridge and its individual games were reviewed twice in Video magazine. In the Winter 1979 issue of Video, the cartridge was reviewed as part of a general review of the Atari VCS. Collectively games 1-12 were given a review score of 9 out of 10 and described as "complex and challenging" whereas games 13-14 were collectively scored a 5 out of 10 and were described as "fine as a substitute for Soletaire but basically pretty dull". A more thorough review appeared in Video's "Arcade Alley" column in the Summer 1979 issue where variations #4 and #6 were singled out individually for specific praise. Variation #4 was described as the best solo-play version, though the reviewers noted that the computer employed a particularly conservative (non-aggressive) strategy. Variation #6 (which allows diagonal movements) was identified as the best tournament game, and was praised for "an elegance of design that promotes frequent replay".

See also

List of Atari 2600 games

References 

1977 video games
Atari 2600 games
Atari games
North America-exclusive video games
Snake video games
Multiplayer and single-player video games
Video games developed in the United States